Back of My Mind is the fourth studio album by singer Christopher Cross, released in 1988 through Warner Bros. Records. After both the album and its singles failed to chart in the United States (although "I Will (Take You Forever)" did chart in several other countries) and due in large part to the general decline in sales beginning with Another Page (1983), Cross was soon released from Warner Bros. "Swept Away" was previously heard on a few episodes of the TV show Growing Pains in 1987. It would be nearly three years until Cross signed a new recording contract with BMG and release a new album, Rendezvous, in 1992.

Track listing

Personnel 

 Christopher Cross – vocals, guitars, arrangements
 Michael Omartian – keyboards, drum programming, string arrangements, arrangements
 Rob Meurer – additional keyboards (1, 9), arrangements
 Jay Dee Maness – steel guitar (4)
 Joe Chemay – bass guitar 
 Alex Acuña – percussion  (2, 8)
 Judd Miller – electronic valve instrument solo and pads (7)
 Dan Higgins – baritone saxophone (8)
 Larry Williams – tenor saxophone (8)
 Tom Scott – lyricon (9), saxophone (10)
 Michael McDonald – backing vocals (1)
 Christine McVie – backing vocals (2)
 Frances Ruffelle – vocals (5)
 Andraé Crouch – backing vocals (8)
 Kevin Dorsey – backing vocals (8)
 Lue McCrary – backing vocals (8)
 Ricky Nelson – backing vocals (8)
 Quartario Tucker – backing vocals (8)
 Fred White – backing vocals (8)
 Karen Blake – backing vocals (10)

Production 
Producer – Michael Omartian
Recorded and Mixed by Terry Christian
Additional Recording – Tom Fouce and Mark Linett
Assistant Engineers – Doug Carleton, Tom Leader, Laura Livingston, and Jeffrey Woodruff.
Production Coordination – Janet Southwell
Photography – Peter Lavery

Chart performance

Certifications

References

External links
Back of My Mind at christophercross.com

Christopher Cross albums
1988 albums
Warner Records albums
Albums produced by Michael Omartian